Puddingstone Dam is a  high earth and rockfill dam in the San Gabriel Valley, within San Dimas in eastern Los Angeles County, California.

The dam was built in 1928 by the Los Angeles County Department of Public Works, which continues to operate it.

Geography
Puddingstone Dam serves mainly for flood control. The reservoir stores floodwater from both the Walnut Creek Wash, and also the San Dimas Wash, to which it is connected by a short artificial channel below San Dimas Dam.

See also
List of dams and reservoirs in California

References

Los Angeles County Department of Public Works dams
Rock-filled dams
San Gabriel Valley
San Dimas, California
Dams completed in 1928
1928 establishments in California